I'm a Mormon was an advertising and outreach campaign by the Church of Jesus Christ of Latter-day Saints from 2010 to 2018 that aimed to combat stereotypes and misconceptions about the church by featuring short profiles from church members (also known as Mormons).

Campaign
Short video clips began airing on American television beginning January 2011, expanding by October to a television, bus and billboard campaign in 12 US cities and Brisbane, Australia. The executive director of the campaign was Stephen B. Allen.  In 2013 the campaign was extended to Ireland and the UK with ads on double-decker buses and the internet, said to be in response to the opening of the musical The Book of Mormon in London. In Melbourne during the 2017 run, the Church advertised at Southern Cross railway station and elsewhere in the city, as well as on television.

The campaign emphasized facts about LDS Church membership through cultural and racial diversity of individuals profiled, representing (in 2011) more than a million claimed LDS members in Mexico and Brazil each, and nearly as many in Asia. The campaign included cooperation from lay members of the church who were encouraged to create a profile on the church website to tell about their Mormon faith and answer common questions. The campaign has been subject of scholarly articles concerning its relationship with Mormonism and women.

The campaign did not air in Iowa, South Carolina or Florida during the 2011 Republican presidential primary season to avoid causing controversy around LDS candidates Mitt Romney and Jon Huntsman.

In October 2018, the President of the Church Russell M. Nelson said that the use of nicknames such as Mormon was "a major victory for Satan." The outreach campaign thus ended.

Notable participants
The following people have appeared as spokespeople in the campaign.
Alex Boye, musician
Elaine Bradley, musician
Rose Datoc Dall, Filipina-American painter
Ron Dittemore, former NASA flight director; president of ATK Launch Systems
Brandon Flowers, musician
Larry Gelwix, rugby coach
William Hopoate, athlete
Jane Clayson Johnson, television anchor
Gladys Knight, singer and actress
Chad Lewis, athlete
Mia Love, former member of U.S. Congress

Rob Morris, athlete
Lacey Nymeyer, athlete
Alan Osmond, musician
Gabe Reid, athlete
Jon Schmidt, musician
Mitch Smith, athlete
Lindsey Stirling, musician
Bruce Summerhays, pro golfer
Patrice Tipoki, musician and actor
Paora Winitana, athlete
Jason F. Wright, author and commentator
Norman Tolk, physicist

Further reading

References

External links
Official website (churchofjesuschrist.org)

2011 in American television
Advertising campaigns
Media of the Church of Jesus Christ of Latter-day Saints
American advertising slogans
2011 introductions